Kalidasu  is a 2008 Telugu language film, directed by G. Ravicharan Reddy and produced by Chinthalapudi Srinivasa Rao and A. Naga Suseela, under Sri Nag Corporation. The film stars Sushanth and Tamannaah. The film was a success at box office playing more than 50 days at a number of centers across Andhra Pradesh.

Plot
 
Kalidasu is the son of a sincere police officer, who is killed in the hands of a factionist (GV). However, Kalidasu kills that factionist and escapes from Rayalaseema and reaches Guntur. Kanakadurga brings him up along with her son Jai Dev . Kalidasu helps Dev to continue his studies in Hyderabad, by turning himself a car-lifter. Baba  buys such lifted cars. His son Basha  also becomes his good friend. Once, Kalidasu lifts a car and finds a girl hiding in it. The girl says that her name is Archana  and pretends that she is a lunatic. But Kalidasu does not believe that she is lunatic and suspects her that she is pretending. Once some goons led by Pratap and Ajay  reach Guntur and take away Mirchi after killing Basha.

Kalidasu goes to Hyderabad after noticing Dev's photo with Mirchi in her mobile phone. However, after going to the college, the principal reveals that Dev is killed by the goons led by a political leader and his henchmen Pratap and Ajay to save the college maintained by Archana (Real name of Mirchi). Kalidasu decides to take revenge against the killers of Basha and Dev. Then Kalidasu starts his mind game and plays a trick, which makes Pratap to kill his own brothers. Later, Ajay kills his brother-in-law Pratap. In the climax, Kalidasu's trick again makes Ajay meet his own death. The film ends on a happy note as Kalidasu and Archana are in Love and lead a happy life.

Cast

Sushanth as Kalidasu
Tamannaah as Archana
Ajay as Ajay
Sunil as Basha
Vamsikrishna as Jayadev
Rajan P. Dev as Home Minister
Vinod Kumar as Pratap
Jayasudha as Kanakadurga
Nagababu as Kalidasu's Father
Ravi Babu as Police Officer
Tanikella Bharani as Principal of College
Chalapathi Rao
Subbaraju
Vajja Venkata Gridhar
Satyam Rajesh
Fish Venkat
Hema

Reception
Telugucinema.com gave a review of rating 3/5 stating "Sushanth makes decent debut. He can become good actor by honing skills further. A very formulaic story but decent film for a debutant." Oneindia Entertainment gave a review stating "Despite less glamour, the debutant hero, Sushant, is able to gain mass hero image. There are several elements in the film like sentiment, glamour, action and love scenes in the film to cater to the needs of all classes of audiences. The film does not appear like a debutant's film and the production values of Sri Nag Corporation are adequate." IndiaGlitz gave a review stating "Sushant showed excellent ease in dances and action scenes, despite it is his debut film. Tamanna too looked gorgeous in the film in ultra modern outfits. She was very romantic all through the film. Though there is not much scope to prove her acting talents, her role was moulded in a near sexy way. The director was able to maintain good tempo all through the film. He did never lose grip on the story. He moulded the hero's character with a sole aim of giving him a mass image." Cinegoer.com gave a review stating "The movie has nothing new or good to offer, but it isn't an unbearable affair either. Sushanth's debut is not bad, but a makeover and voice modulation, some more of the grooming and training (dance-fights-etc) he's obviously received will go a long way. For now, he has miles to travel before he gets a claim to fame. The movie has taken a middling formulaic route." Sify.com gave a review stating the film to be a watchable one.

Music

Music of the film was released on 31 March 2008 at a function organized in Annapurna studios. The function was held without inviting press as it was an exclusive event to Nagarjuna’s MAA TV. The producer has later given the event gallery to the press. The music of the film was composed by Chakri and songs were penned by Chandrabose

References

External links

2008 films
2000s Telugu-language films